A train operating company (TOC) is the term used on the railway system of Great Britain for a railway undertaking operating passenger trains under the collective National Rail brand. TOCs have existed since the privatisation of the network under the Railways Act 1993.

There are two types of TOC: most hold franchises let by the Department for Transport (DfT) through a tendering system, to operate services on certain routes for a specified duration, while a small number of open-access operators hold licences to provide supplementary services on chosen routes. These operators can run services for the duration of the licence validity. The franchised operators have changed considerably since privatisation: previous franchises have been divided, merged, re-let to new operators, or renamed. Some operators have been taken over by a government-owned operator of last resort, due either to failing expectations or to events on the rail system as a whole.

The term is also sometimes used to describe companies operating passenger or freight rail services over tracks owned by another company or a national network owner.

Since British Rail was privatised, most TOCs have been private companies. However, in recent years a number of service have been taken back into public ownership by the Welsh Government, Scottish Government, or DfT.

Management
Franchises were initially let by the Office of Passenger Rail Franchising (OPRAF). This was in turn replaced by the Strategic Rail Authority, which has since been abolished. For England, franchising is now the responsibility of the Department for Transport in the majority of cases. In Scotland, it is the responsibility of Transport Scotland. In Wales, since 2017, the responsibility for the specification and procurement of the Wales & Borders franchise belongs to Transport for Wales. In two parts of England, local government agencies are responsible: in Merseyside, the Merseyside Passenger Transport Executive lets the Merseyrail franchise, while in London, Transport for London (TfL) oversees the new London Overground and Elizabeth line concessions. (London Underground, a wholly owned subsidiary of Transport for London, operates trains nearly all on its own network serving mostly its own stations: It is not a Train Operating Company by the definition here.)

The Rail Delivery Group (RDG) (formerly the Association of Train Operating Companies) provides a commonality for the TOCs and provides some centralised co-ordination. Its activities include the provision of a national timetable and online journey planner facility, and the operation of the various Railcard discount schemes. Eurostar is also a member of the RDG, though it is not itself a TOC.

Organisation
For historical and geographical reasons the railway network of the United Kingdom is split into two independent systems: one in Great Britain (including the Isle of Wight), and one in Northern Ireland, which is closely linked to the railway system of the Republic of Ireland.

Great Britain 
In Great Britain, passenger train services are operated by a number of companies, referred to as Train Operating Companies or TOCs, normally on the basis of regional franchises awarded by the DfT Rail Group. Until 2005 this role was performed by the Strategic Rail Authority. The infrastructure of the railways in England, Scotland, and Wales – including tracks and signalling – is owned and operated not by the train companies but by Network Rail, which took over responsibility from Railtrack in 2002. Most passenger trains are owned by a small number of rolling stock companies (ROSCO) and are leased to the individual TOCs. However, a handful of TOCs own and maintain some of their own rolling stock. Train operating companies also operate most of the network's stations, in their role as station facility owners (SFO), in which they lease the buildings and associated land from Network Rail. Network Rail manages some major railway stations and several stations are operated by London Underground or other companies.

All passenger TOCs in Great Britain are privately owned. The majority of these hold franchises to operate rail services on specific parts of the railway and come under the auspices of the National Rail brand. In addition, companies are able to bid for "paths" (specific parts of the overall National Rail timetable) to operate their own services, which the franchises do not operate – these operators are classed as open-access operators and are not franchise holders. Currently in Great Britain, there are three open-access operators: Hull Trains, which runs services between London King's Cross and Hull, Grand Central, which operates between King's Cross and Sunderland and between  King's Cross and Bradford, and Lumo, which operates between  King's Cross and Edinburgh Waverley. In addition, there are operators that fall outside the purview of National Rail, which operate specific services which are recent additions to Britain's railways. The main examples are urostar, which operates to continental Europe via the Channel Tunnel, and Heathrow Express, which runs fast services from London to Heathrow Airport.

A number of metropolitan railways on the network are operated by the local franchise holder in conjunction with the passenger transport executive or other civic body responsible for administering public transport. One of these bodies, the Merseyside Passenger Transport Executive (Merseytravel) is responsible for one of three National Rail franchises not awarded by central government, namely the Merseyrail franchise, while certain National Rail services in North London came under the control of TfL in November 2007 as London Overground. Two other franchises, the Scottish national franchise, currently operated by ScotRail, and the Welsh domestic franchise, operated by Transport for Wales, are awarded by the devolved governments of the two constituent nations.

The Rail Delivery Group is the coordinating body of the train operating companies in Great Britain and owns the National Rail brand, which uses the former British Rail double-arrow logo and organises the common ticketing structure. Many of the train operating companies are in fact parts of larger companies which operate multiple franchises.

Current operators

Northern Ireland 
The railway network in Northern Ireland is managed differently from the rest of the UK.  The sole company in Northern Ireland that operates trains is NI Railways, who are a subsidiary of Translink, the publicly owned transport corporation, which also runs the Metro buses in Belfast and Ulsterbus coaches around the country. NIR is not a TOC under the terms of the Railways Act 1993, which only applies to Great Britain.  The cross-border service Enterprise (Belfast–Dublin) is jointly operated with Iarnród Éireann, the publicly owned national railway company of the Republic of Ireland.

Changes
Upon privatisation in 1994, the three passenger-operating sectors of British Rail (InterCity, Network SouthEast and Regional Railways) were divided, and their existing operations were let as 25 franchises:

19901999

1994
The privatisation process began when BR's passenger sectors were divided into 25 train operating units which were gradually incorporated as publicly owned subsidiaries of the British Railways Board. They acted as shadow franchises prior to being put to tender:

InterCity

Network SouthEast

Regional Railways

The opening of the Channel Tunnel saw operations by Eurostar begin from London Waterloo to Paris and Brussels.

1996/97
The franchising process was implemented, with various private companies taking over the shadow franchises. Three were awarded to management buyouts. The Great Western Holdings' management also were awarded the North West Regional Railways franchise. The remainder were divided between a handful of major transport operators:

In Northern Ireland, NIR stopped using its own branding on the Enterprise service between Belfast and Dublin when it purchased new rolling stock in conjunction with IÉ, instead launching Enterprise as a separate brand name.

1998
Great Western Holdings, which operated Great Western Trains and North West Trains, became a 100% FirstGroup subsidiary when the 24.5% shareholder bought out its partners. The TOCs were renamed First Great Western and First North Western.

Go-Ahead Group bought the remaining 35% share in Thames Trains.

Virgin Group sold a 49% share in Virgin Rail Group that operated the CrossCountry and West Coast franchises to Stagecoach.

The completion of the rail link to Heathrow Airport led to Heathrow Express, an open-access operator outside the franchising system, beginning its services from London Paddington to Heathrow with operating rights until 2023.

1999 
The shareholdings of M40 Trains were restructured with John Laing owning 84% of the company with the remaining 16% held by former BR managers.

20002009

2000
MTL which operated Merseyrail Electrics and Northern Spirit and Prism Rail that operated c2c (renamed from LTS Rail earlier in the year), Valley Lines Trains, Wales & West, and West Anglia Great Northern were purchased by Arriva and National Express respectively, resulting in the latter owning nine franchises. The two companies transferred to Arriva were renamed Arriva Trains Merseyside and Arriva Trains Northern.

The first open access operator using the National Rail brand, Hull Trains, commenced running its services between King's Cross and Hull.

2001
In 2001, Connex, which had operated two franchises in the south-east of England, were replaced as the operator of the Network SouthCentral franchise by Govia, who began operating it under the name South Central.

Also in 2001, a new franchise, the Wales & Borders franchise was created by the amalgamation of Valley Lines and the majority of services in Wales and the Borders held by Wales & West. The new franchise was initially operated under the name Wales & Borders. The remainder of Wales & West's services in the west of England were renamed Wessex Trains.

2002 
John Laing bought out its partners in M40 Trains.

2003
Connex, having already lost the South Central franchise in 2001, was removed as franchisee of the South Eastern franchise in 2003 on the grounds of poor financial management. It was replaced as the franchise holder by South Eastern Trains, a company wholly owned by the Strategic Rail Authority, which would operate the franchise until it could be tendered again. New franchise holders Arriva Trains Wales and Merseyrail began operating. FirstGroup purchased GB Railways which owned the Anglia Railways and Hull Trains businesses.

2004
A policy where the majority of services (both long-distance and commuter) from each London terminal would all be operated by the same franchise was partially enacted. In April 2004, One commenced operating the Greater Anglia franchise that combined the Anglia Railways and First Great Eastern franchises with the West Anglia Great Northern services radiating out from Liverpool Street. The remainder continuing to be operated as WAGN.

In the North of England, prior to 2004 there were two regional franchises, the North East Regional franchise and the North West Regional franchise. In 2004, these were altered into the TransPennine franchise, for intercity services, and the Northern franchise, for local services that were awarded to First TransPennine Express and Northern Rail respectively. Some North West services were transferred to the Arriva Trains Wales franchise.

In the same year, Thames Trains was superseded by First Great Western Link and ScotRail (National Express) by First ScotRail.

2005
A new operator, Heathrow Connect, jointly run by BAA and First Great Western, began operating stopping services between London Paddington and Heathrow Airport complementing the Heathrow Express.

2006
Three new integrated franchises began operating in April 2006:
First Capital Connect, began operating the Thameslink/Great Northern franchise, on the cross-London Thameslink route and suburban services from London King's Cross and London Moorgate.
First Great Western began operating the Greater Western franchise that combined express and local services from London Paddington to the West of England by amalgamating it with First Great Western Link and Wessex Trains.
Southeastern commenced operating the Integrated Kent franchise taking over services from London Victoria, London Charing Cross, London Cannon Street and London Blackfriars to south-east London and Kent; responsibility for high speed domestic services operated on High Speed 1 from London St Pancras was included in the franchise.

2007
Further integrations occurred in 2007. The first of these was the South Western franchise; this merged the original South West Trains franchise with the Island Line Trains franchise on the Isle of Wight and began operating in February 2007 under the name South West Trains, with Island Line retained as a separate brand.

In November 2007, three new integrated franchises began operating:
CrossCountry, took over from Virgin CrossCountry and parts of Central Trains, and operates regional inter-city services that bypass the major London terminals.
East Midlands Trains replaced Midland Mainline and parts of Central Trains encompassing inter-city services from London St Pancras as well as local services in the East Midlands
London Midland began operating the West Midlands franchise replaced Silverlink County and parts of Central Trains and operates stopping services between London Euston and Northampton, in addition to local services in the West Midlands

In addition to these three, a further new operator, London Overground Rail Operations, took control of the routes operated by Silverlink in London, which were combined with the extended East London line in 2011. Services are controlled directly by TfL, with running of the trains themselves contracted to a private company as an operating concession. This is different from an ordinary franchise, as the train operator is not given control of the strategic aspects of the operation, such as pricing, timetabling and rolling stock procurement.

In December 2007, National Express East Coast took over the running of the InterCity East Coast franchise from GNER. Grand Central also began operating its services between London and Sunderland as an open access operator.

2008
In January 2008, Laing Rail which owned M40 Trains and a 50% shareholding in London Overground Rail Operations was sold to Deutsche Bahn, becoming part of the DB Regio Group.

In February 2008, One was re-branded by National Express as National Express East Anglia to bring it into line with the East Coast franchise.

In April 2008, Wrexham & Shropshire began operating open access services between Wrexham and London Marylebone.

In June 2008, the Gatwick Express franchise was integrated with the South Central franchise operated by Southern.

2009
The government announced that National Express East Coast would have its franchise to operate intercity services along the ECML terminated, and that the franchise would pass into the hands of public-sector company, Directly Operated Railways, which acted as the parent for East Coast.

20102019

2010
Grand Central open-access services from London to Bradford began on 23 May 2010.

2011
DB Regio's operations in the UK were integrated into those of Arriva following the acquisition of the latter by Deutsche Bahn in the previous year.

Owing to continuing losses, Wrexham & Shropshire ceased operating on 28 January 2011.

2012
Abellio Greater Anglia began operating the Greater Anglia franchise on 5 February 2012.

In September 2012, FirstGroup was awarded the right to operate the West Coast franchise which provoked a backlash from incumbent Virgin Trains West Coast. As a result of the Department for Transport having provided incorrect information during the bid process, the offer was withdrawn in October 2012 and £40 million of bid costs refunded.

2014
In September 2014, Govia Thameslink Railway took over services formerly operated by First Capital Connect as part of the Thameslink, Southern & Great Northern franchise and branded them as Thameslink and Great Northern. Services operated by Southern, another Govia subsidiary, were merged into the new franchise in the following year.

Hull Trains became a 100% subsidiary of FirstGroup when the 80% shareholder bought out its partners.

2015
In March 2015, a Stagecoach and Virgin joint venture trading as Virgin Trains East Coast commenced operating the InterCity East Coast franchise.

In April 2015, the ScotRail franchise was split with the Caledonian Sleeper services becoming a stand-alone franchise operated by Serco while the remaining services remained as the Abellio ScotRail franchise.

In May 2015, a number of metro routes run by Abellio Greater Anglia from London Liverpool Street were transferred to TfL to run as a concession similar to both London Overground and Crossrail (under the name, TfL Rail).

2016
In April 2016, FirstGroup trading as TransPennine Express commenced operating the TransPennine Express in its own right, previously having done so in a joint venture with Keolis. On the same date, Arriva Rail North commenced operating the Northern franchise.

In November 2016, Arriva Rail London took over the London Overground concession from London Overground Rail Operations.

2017
In February 2017, National Express sold its subsidiary c2c to Trenitalia.

In March 2017, Abellio sold a 40% share in Abellio Greater Anglia to Mitsui.

In August 2017, a FirstGroup/MTR joint venture trading as South Western Railway commenced operating the South Western franchise.

In December 2017, an Abellio, East Japan Railway Company and Mitsui joint venture trading as West Midlands Trains commenced operating the West Midlands franchise.

2018
In May 2018, the Government announced that Virgin Trains East Coast's contract would be terminated early due to financial difficulties. In June 2018, the company was replaced by the government-owned operator of last resort London North Eastern Railway.

In May 2018, TfL Rail took over the Heathrow Connect services, which led to the introduction of Oyster and Contactless payment to Heathrow Airport for the first time on National Rail.

In October 2018, Transport for Wales took over the Wales & Borders franchise from Arriva Trains Wales.

2019
In August 2019, East Midlands Railway took over the East Midlands franchise from East Midlands Trains.

In December 2019, Avanti West Coast began operating the new West Coast Partnership replacing Virgin Trains West Coast.

2020 onwards

2020
On 1 March 2020, operation of the Northern franchise transferred from Arriva Rail North to the UK government-owned Northern Trains.

Because the COVID-19 pandemic in the United Kingdom caused passenger numbers to reduce to near zero, the UK government took emergency action to support train operating companies by assuming their financial risks. The companies were not allowed to make timetable or staffing changes without government approval. The Office for National Statistics reclassified the companies as public non-financial corporations so borrowing and employees are counted in the public-sector. They were viewed as effectively temporarily renationalised.

2021
On 7 February 2021, the day-to-day operations of the Wales & Borders franchise were transferred to the Welsh-government-owned operator of last resort, Transport for Wales Rail, a subsidiary of Transport for Wales.

On 17 October 2021, the South Eastern franchise was taken over from London & South Eastern Railway by government-owned operator of last resort Southeastern.

On 25 October 2021, Lumo commenced operating open-access services on the East Coast Main Line between London King's Cross and Edinburgh.

2022
On 1 April 2022, ScotRail Trains, owned by Scottish Rail Holdings for the Scottish Government, commenced operating the ScotRail franchise.

In December 2022, Grand Union, an open access operator, was authorised by the Office of Rail and Road to operate trains between London Paddington and  starting in December 2024.

2023
On 25 June 2023, the Scottish Government will take over the Caledonian Sleeper service from Serco.

Railtours

The privatisation of British Rail allowed the introduction of open-access operators, in which companies, upon payment of a fee, could purchase individual slots on the mainline. This has led to the growth in companies offering charter trains, and to the railtour. Most railtour operators run services in part of the country; however, there are a handful that operate services nationwide. Usually, these will see a train made up of ex BR rolling stock pulled by a hired locomotive from one of the freight companies. Occasionally, a preserved ex BR locomotive that is certified to run on the mainline will be made available for such charters.

 Locomotive Services (seasonal)

Sea links
A number of coastal railway stations in the United Kingdom serve to provide connections to ferry services to a number of destinations. 

Most of the ferry operators in these cases set their timetable to run in conjunction with the arrivals and departures of rail services from the stations serving the ferry terminals. 

A handful of these even offer integrated pricing for both rail and ferry travel – because the Island Line is part of the National Rail network, passengers can purchase tickets for travel to any of the stations on the Isle of Wight from any other station in Great Britain. This ticket also covers the cost of passage on the Wightlink catamaran from Portsmouth Harbour to Ryde Pier Head. It is also possible to purchase ferry inclusive tickets from any station in Great Britain to Cowes or East Cowes on the Isle of Wight using Red Funnel ferries, although there are no rail connections from these towns.

International operators
There are two main international services which operate on the railways in the United Kingdom:
Eurostar – runs between London St Pancras, Paris Gare du Nord, Bruxelles Gare du Midi/Brussel Zuidstation / Brussels South and Amsterdam Centraal through the Channel Tunnel.
Enterprise – operates on the Irish network between Belfast Lanyon Place and Dublin Connolly.

A third service which is worth mentioning is Dutchflyer (GoLondon in the Netherlands). This is not a separate rail service in itself as the others are, but a collaboration between Greater Anglia, Stena Line and Nederlandse Spoorwegen to provide an integrated rail/sea/rail service between eastern England (London Liverpool Street, Cambridge, Norwich) and The Netherlands (Amsterdam Centraal) using a single ticket.

A further international service is provided by Venice Simplon Orient Express. Although this is primarily a railtour operator with special trains to various locations in the United Kingdom, it also operates the scheduled Orient Express service to destinations in Europe. This involves two separate trains; the Belmond British Pullman departs from London Victoria and terminates at Folkestone West, where passengers transfer by coach through the Channel Tunnel to Calais; at Gare de Calais-Ville, they then join the Orient Express which then calls at various destinations including Paris, Vienna, Innsbruck, Venice and Rome.

In other countries 
The differentiation between train operating companies and railway infrastructure companies was enforced by European Union legislation and can be found in all EU member countries.

In Germany, train operating companies (Eisenbahnverkehrsunternehmen – EVU) are defined by General Railways Act 1993, s. 2(1) (Allgemeines Eisenbahngesetz (AEG), enacted 27 December 1993) as companies providing train services. They are distinct from Eisenbahninfrastrukturunternehmen (EIU), which own and maintain the railway infrastructure. While there are many private EVU, that have obtained regional franchises, only a handful of long-distance EVU exist (the largest by fare being DB Fernverkehr); the infrastructure is also almost completely owned by Deutsche Bahn subsidiaries.

See also

 List of companies operating trains in the United Kingdom
 Rail transport in Great Britain
 Rail transport in Ireland
 Rail Delivery Group

References

Post-privatisation British railway companies
Privatisation of British Rail
Railway companies of the United Kingdom
Rail transport operators